Ilaria Tocchini (born 4 August 1967 in Livorno) is a retired butterfly swimmer from Italy, who represented her native country in three consecutive Summer Olympics, starting in 1988. She won her first international senior medal, a silver with the women's 4×100 m medley relay team, at the 1987 European Championships (long course) in Strasbourg, France.

References
 RAI Profile

1967 births
Living people
Italian female butterfly swimmers
Swimmers at the 1988 Summer Olympics
Swimmers at the 1992 Summer Olympics
Swimmers at the 1996 Summer Olympics
Olympic swimmers of Italy
Sportspeople from Livorno
European Aquatics Championships medalists in swimming
Mediterranean Games gold medalists for Italy
Swimmers at the 1997 Mediterranean Games
Universiade medalists in swimming
Mediterranean Games medalists in swimming
Universiade gold medalists for Italy
Medalists at the 1987 Summer Universiade